Beatrice of Portugal (1382November 1439), LG, was a natural daughter of John I of Portugal and Inês Pires, born before the marriage of her father with Philippa of Lancaster, daughter of John of Gaunt. She was a sister of Afonso, Duke of Braganza and half-sister of King Edward of Portugal, Infante Peter, Duke of Coimbra, Henry the Navigator, Isabella of Portugal, Duchess of Burgundy, John, Constable of Portugal, and Ferdinand the Saint Prince. Queen Philippa was in charge of the education of both of her husband's children out of wedlock.

Beatrice was born 1382, possibly in Veiros, Alentejo, Portugal. Some say that her mother Inês Pires was "the daughter of a Jewish cobbler." But others say she came from an old Portuguese noble line. In April 1405 her wedding with Thomas Fitzalan, 12th Earl of Arundel by proxy was celebrated in Lisbon and, in the same year, she travelled to England, accompanied by her brother Afonso and many of the king's vassals and her ladies-in-waiting where the marriage ceremony took place on 26 November 1405 in London, with King Henry IV in attendance.

Thomas died on 13 October 1415. Beatrice then married John Holland, Earl of Huntingdon, nephew of her stepmother Queen Philippa, in 1432. She is sometimes confused with another Portuguese lady, Beatrice Pinto, wife of Gilbert Talbot and Thomas Fittiplace. It is unknown if Beatrice had children from any of her marriages. Beatrice died in Bordeaux, France in November 1439. After her death her husband married Lady Anne Montagu.

Ancestry

References

Bibliography

Further reading 
 Douglas Richardson's Royal Ancestry (2013), Vol. II, pp. 538–539 & 613, and Vol. V, p. 119

1380 births
1439 deaths
House of Aviz
15th-century deaths from plague (disease)
Infectious disease deaths in France
House of Braganza
Exeter
English countesses
Illegitimate children of Portuguese monarchs
14th-century Portuguese people
15th-century Portuguese people
14th-century Portuguese women
15th-century Portuguese women
14th-century English people
14th-century English women
15th-century English people
15th-century English women
Ladies of the Garter
Wives of knights
Daughters of kings